The Con may refer to:
 The Con (album), an album by Tegan and Sara
 The Con (film), a 1998 television movie
 Sydney Conservatorium of Music
 The Con (TV series), a 2020 American television series
 The Con (video game), a fighting game with an urban theme